The Organ Festival of Braga (in Portuguese: Festival de órgão de Braga) is a festival dedicated to the Pipe organ, held annually in Braga since 2014. The festival takes place in several churches in the city that feature pipe organs.

The main purpose of the festival is the safeguarding, valorization and dissemination of the bracarense organism heritage, whose value is incalculable, is currently in the national and international panoramas a recognized cultural event.

References 

Annual events in Portugal
Classical music festivals in Portugal
Music festivals in Portugal
2014 establishments in Portugal
Pipe organ festivals
Braga
Music festivals established in 2014
Spring (season) events in Portugal